Below is a list of the 2022 FIFA Club World Cup squads. Each team had to name a 23-man squad (three of whom had to be goalkeepers). Injury replacements were allowed until 24 hours before the team's first match.

Al Ahly 
Manager:  Marcel Koller

Al Hilal 
Manager:  Ramón Díaz

Auckland City 
Manager:  Albert Riera

Flamengo 
Manager:  Vítor Pereira

Real Madrid 
Manager:  Carlo Ancelotti

Seattle Sounders 
Manager:  Brian Schmetzer

Wydad Casablanca 
Manager:  Mehdi Nafti

References

External links
 Official 2022 FIFA Club World Cup website

Squads
FIFA Club World Cup squads